The 2010 African Handball Champions League was the 32nd edition, organized by the African Handball Confederation, under the auspices of the International Handball Federation, the handball sport governing body. The tournament was held from October 21–30, 2010 at the Complexe Sportif Mohammed V in Casablanca, Morocco, contested by 17 teams and won by Étoile Sportive du Sahel of Tunisia.

Draw

Preliminary round 

Times given below are in WET UTC+0.

Group A

* Note:  Advance to quarter-finals Relegated to 9-12th classification Relegated to 13-16th classification

Group B

* Note:  Advance to quarter-finals Relegated to 9-12th classification Relegated to 13-16th classification

Group C

* Note:  Advance to quarter-finals Relegated to 9-12th classification Relegated to 13-16th classification

Group D

* Note:  Advance to quarter-finals Relegated to 9-12th classification Relegated to 13-16th classification

Knockout stage

Championship bracket

5-8th bracket

9-12th bracket

13-16th bracket

* Penalty for failing to pay participation fees

Final ranking

Awards

References

External links
 Tournament profile at goalzz.com
 Official website

African Handball Champions League
African Handball Champions League
African Handball Champions League
2010 Africa Handball Champions League
International handball competitions hosted by Morocco